The Grand Bell Awards, also known as the Daejong Film Awards, is an awards ceremony presented annually by The Motion Pictures Association of Korea for excellence in film in South Korea.

The Grand Bell Awards retains prestige as the oldest continuous film awards held in South Korea, and has been called the Korean equivalent of the American Academy Awards.

History 
The ceremony has been hosted by the Ministry of Culture and Information since 1962. The awards ceased for a couple years beginning in 1969, but were revived in 1972 after the establishment of the Korea Motion Picture Promotion Association, in an effort to stimulate the then-stagnant film industry.

Awards

See also 
Cinema of Korea
List of film awards

References

External links 
 
Grand Bell Awards at Naver 
Grand Bell Awards at Cinemasie
Grand Bell Awards at the Internet Movie Database

 
Awards established in 1962
South Korean film awards
Annual events in South Korea